is a platform shooter game released in arcades by Taito in 1983. The player assumes the role of Agent 17, a spy infiltrating a 30-story building filled with elevators and enemy agents who emerge from closed doors. The goal is to collect secret documents from specially marked rooms, then escape the building. It runs on the Taito SJ System arcade system.

The game was a critical and commercial success for Taito, exceeding sales expectations at the time it released. It was the top-grossing arcade game on the Japanese arcade charts for three months in late 1983, and was among the top five highest-grossing arcade "route" games of 1984 in the United States. It has been ported to a variety of home systems, has had multiple sequels, and appeared on Taito compilations.

Gameplay

Elevator Action is an action platform arcade game. The player assumes the role of Agent 17, codename: "Otto", a secret agent. Otto enters a 30-story building at roof level and must work his way down to the basement, collecting secret documents whose locations are marked by red doors. Along the way, he must use the building's elevator and escalator systems to move from floor to floor and avoid or kill the enemy agents trying to stop him. After picking up all the documents, Otto can escape to the basement and drive away in a waiting car to end the level. Otto can move left and right, jump, duck, and fire up to three shots at a time from his pistol. While Otto is in an elevator, the player can push up or down to send him to a higher or lower floor. He can run or jump across an empty shaft as long as the elevator is above him, and can ride on its roof but not control its motion or cross to the other side. The player can also push up or down to make Otto ride an escalator.

If Otto tries to leave the building without collecting all the documents, he will be transported to the highest floor that still has an unopened red door and must work his way back down. In addition, if he takes too long to clear a level, an alarm will sound; the enemy agents then become more aggressive, and the elevators will be slower to respond to the player's joystick movements.

Each building contains a section in which the lights are out, making it harder to see approaching enemies. On other floors, Otto can temporarily disable the lights by shooting one of the overhead fixtures. Otto is trained in shooting as well as karate. Otto can kill enemy agents by shooting them, jump-kicking them at close range, dropping a light fixture on their heads, or crushing them with an elevator. If he is shot or crushed, or if he falls down an open shaft, the player loses one life.

Release 
During the game's test phase in North America, Mike Von Kennel, marketing manager of Taito America, called the game a  "top test piece" and held high expectations.  It was released by in Japan on May 23, 1983, and in North America during October of that same year. In North America, while also sold as a dedicated cabinet, it was Taito's first game to be sold as a conversion kit in that territory. It was available in Europe by January 1984.

Ports 
Elevator Action was first ported to the Family Computer by Micronics, and this version was published by Taito in Japan on June 28, 1985. The Famicom version was later released in North America on the Nintendo Entertainment System around 1987. Taito later made and published their own port of the game for the MSX around 1985. Around that same time, under license from Taito, Sega made and published a version of the game for the SG-1000. It was later ported to the ZX Spectrum, Amstrad CPC, and Commodore 64. A port was in development for the Atari 2600, but was cancelled.

The Famicom/NES version of Elevator Action was re-released for the Wii Virtual Console in Japan on April 3, 2007, and in North America on March 5 later that year. It was later re-released exclusively in Japan for the Wii U Virtual Console on February 19, 2014, and for the 3DS Virtual Console on March 12 of that same year. The arcade version was later re-released on the PlayStation 4 on October 26, 2017, and later on the Nintendo Switch on March 14, 2019, by Hamster Corporation as part of their Arcade Archives series. Elevator Action is included in the compilations Taito Legends, Taito Memories Gekan, Taito Memories Pocket, and Taito Legends Power Up. The game is also included in Elevator Action Returns S-Tribute as a hidden game, which players can unlock by clearing every stage.

Reception 

Elevator Action quickly became a commercial success for Taito. In Japan, Game Machine listed Elevator Action in their August 1983 issues as the most-successful new table arcade unit of the month. It then topped the Game Machine table arcade cabinet charts for three months in late 1983, from September through October to November 1983, and persisted on their charts up until the April 1, 1984 issue.

In the first month of the North American release, the game was said to have "surpassed all expectations" in terms of popularity and sales by Keith Egging, the vice president of product development at Taito America. The game was reportedly popular with patrons at the 1983 Amusement Expo. Conversion kits for the game were also popular, and the number of kits sold set an "enviable record" for the company. It was among the top five highest-grossing arcade games of 1984 in American street/route locations.

It received a positive review from Computer and Video Games magazine in January 1984, with the reviewer stating it "has a really original theme and I found it a pleasant change from the normal spaceage shoot-em-ups." In a 1984 issue of Video Games, Steve Harris wrote, "it was a good action game which allows for a great deal of player input", and while he feared that it might have been overshadowed by the laserdisc games of the time, thought the game was as competent as those. It received a Certificate of Merit as part of the 1985 Arkie Awards.

Retrospective
Eurogamer wrote that it was "astonishing just how playable it remains". In The Video Games Guide: 1,000+ Arcade, Console and Computer Games, Matt Fox wrote that the game was an "enjoyable arcade game", giving it three out of five stars according to the book's own rating system.

Reviewing the Taito Egret II mini-arcade version in March 2022, Metro said it is "simple stuff but enjoyable and not as ridiculously hard as you’d expect given when it was released." They also praised the "unusually deliberate action" and said it has elements found in the later games Impossible Mission, Rolling Thunder and Shinobi.

Legacy
In 1991, a version of Elevator Action was made for the Game Boy, developed and published by Taito. While it retains the gameplay of the original arcade version otherwise, it includes new gameplay elements like power-ups and new weapons. A port of the game for EZweb mobile phones was released on April 15, 2004. This mobile version was later published in North America by Sony Pictures Digital around 2006.

A sequel, Elevator Action Returns, was released in arcades in 1994. Elevator Action EX is an updated version of the game released for the Game Boy Color in 2000. Elevator Action Old & New is a further update for the Game Boy Advance, published in 2002. A later remake of the game, titled Elevator Action Deluxe, was released on PlayStation Network on August 31, 2011. The game contains single player and multiplayer modes, as well as the original arcade game.

Revealed at AOU 2009, Elevator Action: Death Parade is an arcade light gun shooter that uses elevator doors when changing scenarios. In June 2021, UNIS then released Elevator Action Invasion, another arcade lightgun game.

Notes

References

External links
 
 High Score Rankings for Elevator Action from Twin Galaxies

1983 video games
Amstrad CPC games
Arcade video games
Cancelled Atari 2600 games
Cancelled Atari 5200 games
Commodore 64 games
Game Boy games
Mobile games
MSX games
NEC PC-8801 games
Nintendo Entertainment System games
Nintendo Switch games
Platform games
PlayStation 4 games
SG-1000 games
Sharp X1 games
Sony mobile games
Spy video games
Square Enix franchises
Virtual Console games
Virtual Console games for Wii U
Works set in elevators
ZX Spectrum games
Taito arcade games
Taito SJ System games
Multiplayer and single-player video games
Video games developed in Japan
Hamster Corporation games